Genes, Chromosomes & Cancer is a monthly peer-reviewed academic journal published by Wiley-Blackwell. According to the Journal Citation Reports, the journal has a 2014 impact factor of 4.041.

References

External links 
 

Oncology journals